Robinson Heights in Antarctica is the mainly ice-covered heights (2,170 m), elliptical in plan and 15 nautical miles (28 km) long, which rise south of Anare Pass and form the northwest end of the Admiralty Mountains. It was mapped by the United States Geological Survey (USGS) from surveys and U.S. Navy photography, 1960–63, and was named by the Advisory Committee on Antarctic Names (US-ACAN) for Edwin S. Robinson, a United States Antarctic Research Program (USARP) geophysicist at McMurdo Sound in 1960. He participated in a number of geophysical traverses, including his leadership of the South Pole Station Traverse, 1962–63.

Mountains of Victoria Land
Pennell Coast